Run with the Hunted may refer to:

 Run with the Hunted, a 2007 album by Skyhill
 "Run with the Hunted", a song on the album
 Run with the Hunted (film), a 2019 American film starring Michael Pitt